Lodi, Illinois, may refer to the following communities in Illinois, all of which were once known as Lodi:
Clark Center, Illinois, in Clark County
Maple Park, Illinois, in Kane County
Oswego, Illinois, in Kendall County